Philistina is a genus of beetles belonging to the family Scarabaeidae, typically placed in the tribe Phaedimini .

Species
 Philistina aurita (Arrow, 1910)
 Philistina benesi Drumont, 1998
 Philistina bicoronata (Jordan, 1894)
 Philistina campagnei (Bourgoin, 1920)
 Philistina fujiokai (Jakl, 2011)
 Philistina gestroi (Arrow, 1910)
 Philistina inermis (Janson, 1903)
 Philistina javana (Krikken, 1979)
 Philistina khasiana (Jordan, 1894)
 Philistina knirschi (Schürhoff, 1933)
 Philistina manai Antoine, 2002
 Philistina microphylla (Wood-Mason, 1881)
 Philistina minettii (Antoine, 1991)
 Philistina nishikawai Sakai, 1992
 Philistina pilosa (Mohnike, 1873)
 Philistina rhinophylla (Wiedemann, 1823)
 Philistina sakaii Alexis & Delpont, 2001
 Philistina salvazai (Bourgoin, 1920)
 Philistina squamosa Ritsema, 1879
 Philistina tibetana (Janson, 1917)
 Philistina tonkinensis (Moser, 1903)
 Philistina vollenhoveni Mohnike, 1871
 Philistina zebuana Kraatz, 1895

Cetoniinae